Huang Qingxue (born 5 December 1960) is a Chinese engineer and administrator who is the president of Taiyuan University of Technology since 2015.

Biography
Huang was born in Shulan, Jilin, on 5 December 1960. He earned a bachelor's degree in 1984, a master's degree in 1989, and a doctor's degree in 1993, all from Yanshan University.

After university, he joined the faculty of Taiyuan University of Technology, becoming vice president in February 2010 and president in December 2015. He concurrently served as dean of Metal Composite Forming Technology and Equipment Research Institute since August 2019.

He is a delegate to the 13th National People's Congress.

Honours and awards 
 2011 Science and Technology Progress Award of the Ho Leung Ho Lee Foundation
 November 27, 2017 Member of the Chinese Academy of Engineering (CAE)

References

1960 births
Living people
People from Shulan
Engineers from Jilin
Yanshan University alumni
Academic staff of Taiyuan University of Technology
Members of the Chinese Academy of Engineering
Delegates to the 13th National People's Congress